China News Service (CNS) is the second largest state news agency in China, after Xinhua News Agency. China News Service was formerly run by the Overseas Chinese Affairs Office, which was absorbed into the United Front Work Department of the Chinese Communist Party (CCP) in 2018. Its operations have traditionally been directed at overseas Chinese worldwide and residents of Hong Kong, Macau and Taiwan.

History
CNS was established in 1952 as a successor to the CCP's International News Agency. It has news offices and stations in every province in mainland China, as well as in Hong Kong and Macau. CNS also has news offices in foreign countries, including the United States, Japan, France, Thailand, New Zealand, and Australia. According to the Jamestown Foundation, CNS is "the CCP’s main propaganda organ targeting overseas Chinese." 

In 1990, CNS personnel were dispatched to the U.S. to found SinoVision and The China Press to counter negative perceptions of the Chinese government following the 1989 Tiananmen Square protests and massacre.

Since 2001, CNS has held a biannual Global Chinese Language Media Forum in China. In 2007, CNS established the China News Service Overseas Center, which provides news reports, editorials, and layout for overseas Chinese media outlets.

In 2014, CNS published an editorial which derided outgoing American ambassador to China Gary Locke. The editorial was widely criticized both within China and internationally for referring to the Chinese American ambassador as a banana which was interpreted as a racial slur. The article also mocked his Mandarin Chinese abilities and said that his ancestors would disown him if they knew about his loyalties.

In 2018, CNS became part of the United Front Work Department (UFWD) when its host organization, the Overseas Chinese Affairs Office, was folded into the UFWD. The same year, a deputy head of the UFWD stated that "[a]s an important propaganda unit of the United Front, CNS must adhere to the concept of ‘newspapers run by politicians’ and thoroughly carry out political awareness work. CNS's important mission is to do good united front propaganda work within Overseas Chinese affairs.”

In 2019, CNS began a campaign to increase its influence on overseas social media. According to the Australian Strategic Policy Institute, CNS was involved in targeted disinformation and propaganda campaigns during the 2019–20 Hong Kong protests. According to a 2020 investigation by ProPublica, CNS hired a third-party firm to create fake Twitter accounts to spread conspiracy theories and disinformation related to the COVID-19 pandemic.

In June 2020, the United States Department of State designated China News Service, along with other Chinese state media outlets, as a foreign mission.

During the 2022 Russian invasion of Ukraine, CNS repeated unsubstantiated Russian state media claims that the Bucha massacre was staged.

Affiliates 
CNS controls the Chinese New Zealand Herald, which is co-owned by New Zealand Media and Entertainment.

Personnel 
The editor-in-chief of CNS until February 2015 was Liu Beixian, who was later charged with bribery offenses during the anti-corruption campaign under Xi Jinping.

See also

Chinese information operations and information warfare
Mass media in China
China Internet Information Center

References

External links

 

Mass media in China
News agencies based in China
Communist propaganda
Chinese propaganda organisations
Organizations associated with the Chinese Communist Party
Disinformation operations
Information operations units and formations
State media
Conspiracist media
Uyghur genocide denial
United front (China)